Melvin Lee Moeschberger (June 26, 1940 – January 9, 2019) was an American biostatistician.

Early life 
Moeschberger was a native of Berne, Indiana, born to parents Howard and Luella. He studied mathematics and chemistry at Taylor University and completed a master's degree at Ohio University before earning a doctorate in statistics from North Carolina State University, followed by postdoctoral work at the University of North Carolina. He taught biostatistics at Ohio State University for three decades, and retired from the University of Missouri after ten years. Moeschberger was a fellow of the American Association for the Advancement of Science and the American Statistical Association. He died in Fishers, Indiana.

References

1940 births
2019 deaths
Biostatisticians
American statisticians
North Carolina State University alumni
Ohio University alumni
Taylor University alumni
Ohio State University faculty
University of Missouri faculty
People from Berne, Indiana
Fellows of the American Association for the Advancement of Science
Scientists from Indiana
Fellows of the American Statistical Association